Ayano (written: , , ,  or ) is both a feminine Japanese given name and a surname. Notable people with the name include:

, Japanese singer-songwriter
, Japanese synchronized swimmer
, Japanese tarento and impressionist
, Japanese long-distance runner
, Japanese trampolinist
, Japanese model and actress
, Japanese actress
, Japanese volleyball player
, Japanese voice actress
Ayano Ninomiya (born 1979), Japanese-American violinist
, Japanese singer and dancer
Ayano Sato (canoeist) (born 1996), Japanese slalom canoeist
, Japanese idol
, Japanese speed skater
, Japanese volleyball player
, Japanese tennis player
, Japanese singer-songwriter
, Japanese actress, voice actress and idol
, Japanese beauty pageant winner
, Japanese manga artist

Surname 
, Japanese actor
, Japanese singer

Fictional characters 
Ayano Aishi, protagonist of the video game Yandere Simulator
, protagonist of the manga series Hanebado!
Ayano Kannagi, the female protagonist of Kaze no Stigma
Ayano Kosaka, a character in Code Geass: Akito the Exiled
Ayano Minegishi, a character from manga and anime, Lucky Star
Ayano Sugiura, in Yuru Yuri
Ayano Tateyama, a character from the Vocaloid song series Kagerou Project
Keiko Ayano (Silica), a character in Sword Art Online

Japanese feminine given names
Japanese-language surnames